Pengo may refer to:

Pengo (video game), a 1982 video arcade game
Hungarian pengő, the name of an old Hungarian currency
Pengo language, a Dravidian language spoken in south central India
Babungo language, an alternate term for the African language Pengo
Polycarp Pengo, a Tanzanian cardinal